LAPD Hooper Heliport  is a city-owned private-use heliport located one nautical mile (2 km) northeast of the central business district of Los Angeles, in Los Angeles County, California, United States.

History
Hooper Heliport is located on the roof of the C. Erwin Piper Technical Center, the world's largest rooftop airport.  It is centrally located next to Los Angeles Union Station.  It is home to the Los Angeles Police Department's Air Support Division which is the largest metropolitan police aviation unit in the U.S. with 16 helicopters.

The Piper Technical Center is also used as a parking lot for the LAPD motor pool including marked and unmarked units, vans, buses, motorcycles, and the V-100 SWAT armored cars.

Hooper Heliport served as home base for the fictional police helicopter Blue Thunder in the 1983 motion picture of the same name, while construction of the heliport was still being completed.

See also 
 LAPD Air Support Division
 List of airports in the Los Angeles area
 Police aviation

References

External links 
 
 

Airports in Los Angeles County, California
Heliports in the United States
Los Angeles Police Department
Police aviation